The Prosecutor of the International Criminal Court (ICC), Fatou Bensouda, on 20 December 2019 announced an investigation into war crimes allegedly committed in Palestine by Israeli personnel or members of Hamas and other Palestinian armed groups. The allegations include the establishing of illegal West Bank settlements and violations of the law of war by personnel of the Israeli Defence Forces during the 2014 Gaza War, including claims of targeting Red Cross installations. Members of armed Palestinian organizations, including Hamas, have been accused of deliberately attacking Israeli civilians and using Palestinians as human shields. Israel is not a member of the ICC and disputes its jurisdiction on the basis that Palestine is not a sovereign state capable of being a party to the Rome Statute, and Israeli Prime Minister Benjamin Netanyahu has repeatedly condemned the allegations and investigation.

Jurisdiction of ICC 
The jurisdiction of the ICC is limited to the territories and nationals of state parties. Israel signed the Rome Statute on Dec 31st 2000 but did not ratify it. Palestine became a state party with effect from 1 April 2015.

The Palestinian National Authority submitted an ad hoc declaration on 22 January 2009, dated the previous day, accepting the Court's jurisdiction for "acts committed on the territory of Palestine since 1 July 2002." On 3 April 2012 the ICC Prosecutor deemed the declaration invalid because the Rome Statute only permits "States" to make such a declaration and Palestine was designated an "observer entity" within the United Nations (the body that is the depositary for the Rome Statute) at the time.

On 29 November 2012, the United Nations General Assembly passed resolution 67/19, recognising Palestine as a non-member observer state. In November 2013 the Prosecutor concluded that this decision did "not cure the legal invalidity of the 2009 declaration." A second declaration accepting the court's jurisdiction was reportedly submitted in July 2014 by Palestine's Justice Minister Saleem al-Saqqa and General Prosecutor Ismaeil Jabr, but the ICC Prosecutor responded that only the head of state, head of government or minister of foreign affairs has the authority to make such a declaration. After failing to receive confirmation from Minister of Foreign Affairs Riyad al-Maliki during an August meeting that the declaration had been made on behalf of the Palestinian government, the Prosecutor concluded that the declaration was invalid because it did not come from an authority with the power to make it.

In a published opinion in August 2014, the ICC Prosecutor said that, as a result of Palestine′s new status, Palestine could now join the Rome Statute. On 2 September 2014, the Prosecutor clarified that if Palestine filed a new declaration, or acceded to the Rome Statute, it would be deemed valid. In December 2014, the assembly of state parties of the ICC recognized Palestine as a "State" without prejudice to any legal or other decisions taken by the court or any other organization. A third declaration was submitted by Palestine on 1 January 2015, dated 31 December 2014, accepting the court's jurisdiction effective 13 June 2014. Palestine acceded to the Rome Statute on 2 January 2015, with effect on 1 April 2015, and the prosecutor accepted Palestine as state party. The court did not make a ruling on the legal validity of this decision.

A preliminary investigation was commenced in 2015. Israel has argued that the court has no jurisdiction because Palestine is not a sovereign state, as Israeli attorney general Avichai Mandelblit argued in a brief released hours before Bensouda's announcement in December 2019.

Bensouda report 
According to Bensouda in December 2019, the criteria for a full investigation had all been met, but jurisdiction had not been established. Bensouda stated, "I am satisfied that war crimes have been or are being committed in the West Bank, including East Jerusalem, and the Gaza Strip".

According to Bensouda's report, the Israeli judicial system already makes provision for punishing those accused of war crimes—meaning that the ICC may not have jurisdiction over alleged Israeli violations; Bensouda wrote that she will have to keep reviewing the “scope and genuineness of relevant domestic proceedings” that remain ongoing. Bensouda also found "a reasonable basis to believe that members of Hamas and Palestinian armed groups" are guilty of war crimes, but these groups have no mechanism for punishing such violations.

Israel is accused of illegally establishing West Bank settlements and violating the laws of war during the 2014 Gaza War, including claims of targeting Red Cross installations. Armed Palestinian organizations, including Hamas, are accused of deliberately attacking Israeli civilians and using Palestinians as human shields.

Responses 
Israel: Israeli prime minister Benjamin Netanyahu condemned the investigation as "a black day for truth and justice" and "pure antisemitism", while Israeli newspaper Yedioth Ahronoth denounced "The Hague's hypocrisy" in a headline. In an interview with Times of Israel Bensouda described the charge of antisemitism as "a particularly regrettable accusation that is without merit" and emphasized that the court strives to be fair and impartial.

United States and others: Secretary of State Mike Pompeo stated, "We firmly oppose this and any other action that seeks to target Israel unfairly." Australia argued that the issues should be resolved by negotiation, while Germany stated that it trusts the court and wants to avoid politicising the case. Hungary announced that it agrees with Israel's arguments about jurisdiction.

Palestinian Authority: The Palestinian Authority issued a statement declaring that "Palestine welcomes this step as a long overdue step to move the process forward towards an investigation, after nearly five long and difficult years of preliminary examination".

Prosecutor’s final decision 
On 16 March 2020, following the submission of amicus curiae briefs, Bensouda requested another month to weigh the question of Palestinian statehood and jurisdiction over the West Bank, Gaza and East Jerusalem. About 50 countries and NGOs had filed such briefs for consideration and on April 29, 2020, over 180 Palestinian and international organizations, and individuals filed an open letter in support of Palestine. Amici curiae filings made by eight states parties, Australia, Austria, Brazil, Canada, Czech Republic, Germany, Hungary and Uganda argued that the ICC did not have jurisdiction on the grounds that Palestine is not a state.

On 30 April 2020, Bensouda stood by her initial finding, writing "The Prosecution has carefully considered the observations of the participants and remains of the view that the Court has jurisdiction over the Occupied Palestinian Territory,"

ICC jurisdiction ruling 
On 5 February 2021, the ICC "decided, by majority, that the Court's territorial jurisdiction in the Situation in Palestine, a State party to the ICC Rome Statute, extends to the territories occupied by Israel since 1967, namely Gaza and the West Bank, including East Jerusalem." Judges ruled that the court has jurisdiction, rejecting Israel's argument to the contrary. The decision does not attempt to determine statehood or legal borders. Presiding Judge Péter Kovács appended a partly dissenting opinion.

On 3 March, within a month of the ICC ruling, the prosecutor opened the investigation which "will cover crimes within the jurisdiction of the Court that are alleged to have been committed in the Situation [of Palestine] since 13 June 2014, the date to which reference is made in the Referral of the Situation to my Office." Without Palestine’s additional declaration, the court would only have jurisdiction over events in Palestine after 1 April 2015. On 1 January 2015, the New York Times reported Shawan Jabarin, director of the human rights group Al Haq, saying that "the Palestinians would submit a request for retroactive jurisdiction to last June 13, to coincide with the period being considered" by the United Nations Fact Finding Mission on the 2014 Israel–Gaza conflict." According to the Associated Press, "the Palestinians chose June 2014 as the start of the investigation to coincide with the run-up to Israel's devastating Gaza war that summer."

Investigation 
The ICC prosecutor’s office said on 18 March 2021 that it had sent formal notices to Israel and the Palestinian Authority giving them a month "to seek deferral by proving they are carrying out their own investigations". The prosecutor’s office confirmed in a written statement to the Associated Press "that on March 9 the letters were sent to all of the court’s member states." On 18 March 2021, the Times of Israel, citing Israel's Channel 13, reported that Israel received a letter from the ICC briefly laying out the three main areas the investigation will cover: the 2014 Gaza War, Israeli settlement policy and the 2018–2019 Gaza border protests. Israel was given 30 days to respond. After being interrogated at the Jordan Palestine border crossing following his return to the West Bank on 21 March 2021, after a meeting with the ICC Prosecutor at The Hague, Minister of Foreign Affairs and Expatriate Riyad Malki said that the Israeli authorities threatened to impose sanctions for communicating with the ICC but that contact would continue regardless. On 8 April 2021, Israel said it will write to say that it will not cooperate with the ICC’s investigation, arguing that the court did not have jurisdiction and pointing to its own independent judiciary capable of trying soldiers who commit war crimes.

Minister of Foreign Affairs and Expatriates Riyad Al-Maliki met Khan at the Hague on June 9, 2022 and "questioned the delay in the Court's investigations into the Palestinian issue". According to WAFA, Khan said that Palestine is one of the cases that the Court is looking at and that failure is not an option.
The Jerusalem Post reported that, as of June 18, 2022, a year since Fatou Bensouda was replaced by Karim Khan, he "has not issued a single public statement or taken a single public action regarding Israel-Palestine". He has taken a strong active position on the 2022 Russian invasion of Ukraine, with international support, based on Ukraine filing an ad hoc acceptance of crimes committed on its territory and even though Russia is not an ICC member, similar to the Palestinian situation. In May, the Palestinian human rights organizations Al-Haq, Al-Mezan and the Palestinian Center for Human Rights (PCHR) submitted a casefile to the ICC in respect of alleged crimes committed in Gaza during the 2021 Israel–Palestine crisis. Submissions have also been made regarding the death of Shireen Abu Akleh, added to an existing April filing in respect of four other journalists, "arguing that Israeli security forces have been systematically targeting Palestinian journalists in violation of international humanitarian law."

See also 
United Nations Fact Finding Mission on the 2014 Israel–Gaza conflict

References

Further reading 

Nathaniel Berman, 'Jerusalem before the International Courts: Utopias 2020'

External links 
ICC – Preliminary examination State of Palestine
B'tselem reaction to Mandelblit position paper
Diakonia Q&A

Israeli–Palestinian conflict
December 2019 events
Palestine
Politics of the State of Palestine